Sishui may refer to the following in China:

Sishui County (泗水县), in Shandong
Si River, or Sishui (泗水), river in Shandong
Sishui Pass (汜水关), or Hulao Pass, mountain pass in Henan
Sishui, Postal Romanization for Xishui County, Hubei
Sishui Kingdom (泗水國), kingdom of Han dynasty
Sishui Commandery (泗水郡), commandery of Qin dynasty

Towns
Sishui, Gulang County (泗水镇), in Gulang County, Gansu
Sishui, Gaozhou (泗水镇), Guangdong
Sishui, Pingyuan County, Guangdong (泗水镇), town
Sishui, Xingyang (汜水镇), Henan
Sishui, Sishui County (泗水镇), Shandong